Barker is a small village located in the Colonia Department of southwestern Uruguay.

Geography
Barker is located along Route 54. Its nearest populated places are Rosario, to the southeast and Tarariras, to the west. Near the town it is the stream Arroyo Minuano and the hills Cuchilla del Minuano and Cuchilla del Colla.

History
Barker was originally established as a small British settlement in Uruguay.

Population
According to the 2011 census, Barker had a population of 158.
 
Source: Instituto Nacional de Estadística de Uruguay

References

External links 
 Map of Barker
 Barker, Uruguay

Populated places in the Colonia Department